Kristin Solberg (born 1982) is a Norwegian journalist and author. She is the Middle East correspondent for NRK and presently based in Beirut. Previously she covered the Middle East and South Asia forAftenposten.

Solberg has a bachelor's degree in journalism from Sheffield University and a master's degree in international relations from London school of Economics. She has also studied Arabic in Lebanon and worked for a newspaper there. After working temporarily for Aftenposten in Norway in 2007, she started as a freelance correspondent in New Delhi and became the South Asia correspondent for Aftenposten. She was based in Kabul from 2011 and 2013. In 2013 she became based in Cairo as a Middle East correspondent. In December 2014 she got the position of correspondent in Istanbul where she will cover West-Asia and part of the Middle East.

She has written one book about Pakistan and one about a midwife school in Afghanistan.

Awards 
International Reporter Journalist Prize for Gjennom de renes land - Rapport fra Pakistan (2011)
Den store journalistprisen, with Anders Sømme Hammer (2014)
The Bjørnson Prize (2014)

Bibliography 
Gjennom de renes land - Rapport fra Pakistan 2011  
Livets skole 2013

References 

1982 births
Living people
Alumni of the London School of Economics
Norwegian newspaper journalists
Norwegian newspaper reporters and correspondents
Norwegian non-fiction writers
Norwegian women non-fiction writers 
21st-century Norwegian women writers
Norwegian expatriates in India
Norwegian expatriates in Egypt
Aftenposten people
NRK people